"A Place in the Sun" is a 1966 soul single by American and Motown musician Stevie Wonder. Written by Ronald Miller and Bryan Wells, it was one of Wonder's first songs to contain social commentary.  "A Place in the Sun" was his third Top Ten hit since 1963, hitting number 9 on the Billboard pop singles chart and number 3 on the R&B charts.  Billboard described the song as a "folk-oriented release" to which Wonder gives an "exciting treatment."  The Originals and The Andantes sang background vocals on the recording. Stevie Wonder also recorded a version of the song in Italian titled "Il Sole è di Tutti" (The Sun is for Everyone).

Chart positions

Cover versions
 The Rascals covered the song on their 1967 album [[Groovin' (The Young Rascals album)|Groovin''']].
 Bill Cosby on his 1967 album Silver Throat: Bill Cosby Sings.
Engelbert Humperdinck did his version of the song on his 1967 album The Last Waltz.
 Diana Ross & the Supremes & The Temptations on their 1968 album Diana Ross & the Supremes Join The Temptations, which hit number 2 on the Billboard "Top Pop Albums Charts".
 The Four Tops for their 1968 LP Yesterday's Dreams.
 The Staple Singers for their 1968 album What the World Needs Now Is Love.
 Glen Campbell from his 1968 album A New Place in the Sun''.
 David Isaacs (singer) in 1968 on Lee "Scratch" Perry's Upsetter label.
 The Gabe Dixon Band in the end credits of the 2006 film Charlotte's Web.

References

External links 
 List of cover versions of ”A Place in the Sun” at SecondHandSongs.com

1966 singles
Stevie Wonder songs
Songs written by Ron Miller (songwriter)
The Supremes songs
Glen Campbell songs
Tamla Records singles
1966 songs